Qionglai is a county-level city of Sichuan Province, Southwest China, it is under the administration of the prefecture-level city of Chengdu. The city is located on the western edge of the Sichuan Basin and in the foothills of the Qionglai Mountains that bound the basin from the west, and is bordered by the prefecture-level city of Ya'an to the west.

Transport 

China National Highway 318
Rivers and Water
There are many rivers around in Qionglai City, so it has abundant water power. South River, Zhuojiang River, Xiejiang River and Pujiang River flow through this city, and they are 217.15 kilometers long in total. The quantity of runoff of surface water may reach 991 million cubic meters, including 532.8 million cubic meters which can be made use of by humans.  Underground water can reach 106 million cubic meters. Surface and underground water create many opportunities to support  agriculture and manufacture.

Climate

See also
Qionglai Air Base
Stone Pagoda Temple

References

External links
Humanity in Qionglai
Qionglai in Google map

 
Geography of Chengdu
County-level cities in Sichuan